The Houma–Xi'an railway or Houxi railway, is a railroad in northern China, between Houma in Shanxi Province and Xi'an in neighboring Shaanxi Province.  The railway has a total length of 289 km.  Construction of the line began in the 1950s, was restarted in 1983 and was completed in 1985.  Major cities and towns along route include Houma, Hancheng, Fuping and Xian.

Rail connections
Houma: Datong–Puzhou railway, Houma–Yueshan railway
Xi'an: Longhai railway, Xi'an–Ankang railway, Baotou–Xi'an railway.

See also
 List of railways in China

References

Railway lines in China
Rail transport in Shanxi
Rail transport in Shaanxi